Portrait of the Artist's Family is a 1558–59 oil on canvas painting by the Italian artist Sofonisba Anguissola in the Nivaagaard art gallery.

This painting shows the artist's family in a landscape and portrays her father Amilcare, sister Minerva, and brother Asdrubale with their pet dog. The picture is considered unfinished, and it is supposed that she left it in its unfinished state to obey a summons by King Philip II of Spain, where she became court painter for 20 years. This is the only known portrait of her father, but Sofonisba had painted Minerva a few years before when she made a picture of her sisters playing chess.

This painting was purchased by the museum founder Johannes Hage at the estate auction of the Danish painter Wilhelm Marstrand along with a painting by that artist in 1873. It is considered one of the most important works by the artist from her early period.

See also
 List of paintings by Sofonisba Anguissola

References

artwork record on Europeana website

1550s paintings
Artist's Family
16th-century paintings in Denmark
Dogs in art
Paintings of children
Unfinished paintings
Group portraits by Italian artists